Rud. Ibach Sohn was a piano manufacturer in Barmen, Rhineland, Germany from 1794 to 2007.

The owners Rudolf Ibach's widow, Rudolf and Max Ibach were awarded an imperial and royal warrant of appointment to the court of Austria-Hungary.

References

External links 

 Official homepage

Companies based in North Rhine-Westphalia
Piano manufacturing companies of Germany
Purveyors to the Imperial and Royal Court
Purveyors to the Court of Sweden
Purveyors to the Russian imperial family
British Royal Warrant holders